Ellahy Amen Records is an American-French independent avant-garde record label, launched in 2002 by former Pigface member and experimental/avant-garde musician Leila Bela. The record label is based both in Paris, France and Austin, Texas, United States. Currently, the label has three artists signed to the roster.

Roster 
Leila Bela
Maya Bond
Lexion Blacklord

See also 
 List of record labels

External links
 Official site

Ellahy Amen Records
Ellahy Amen Records
Record labels established in 2002
2002 establishments in France
2002 establishments in the United States